Gurid or Goorid may refer to:

 Ghurid dynasty

Places
 Gurid-e Bala
 Gurid-e Sar Bisheh